Hypaedalea butleri is a moth of the family Sphingidae. It is known from forests from Sierra Leone to Congo and Uganda.

The length of the forewings is 25–27 mm for males and females. The thorax has a large green median dorsal patch that extends onto the head and is laterally bordered by a brown line. The abdomen is pale yellowish-brown. The thorax and abdomen are buff-yellow ventrally. The forewing upperside is purplish-brown with irregular narrow dark brown transverse lines, a minute discal spot and a broad well defined very irregular dark purple brown marginal band. The hindwing upperside is uniformly dark brown.

References

Macroglossini
Moths described in 1894
Moths of Africa
Insects of West Africa
Insects of Uganda
Insects of the Central African Republic
Fauna of Gabon